Charles Koshiro Chibana (born September 11, 1989) is a judoka from Brazil of Japanese origin. He won a gold medal at the 2015 Pan American Games. In addition, he won a gold medal at the 2014 and 2016 Pan American Judo Championships and a bronze medal at the 2013 edition.

Judo career
Chibana was born in São Paulo, Brazil, and is a member of Esporte Clube Pinheiros in São Paulo.

In 2007, Chibana was part of the Brazilian team who came in second at the World Judo Team Championships in Beijing. In 2008, he once again won a medal at the World Judo Team Championships, this time finishing third in Tokyo.

In 2013, he came in fifth place in the 2013 World Judo Championships in Rio de Janeiro.

In 2015, Chibana won the gold medal in the 2015 Pan American Games in Toronto. He was eliminated in the first bout at the 2016 Olympics.

Coaching career
On 14 May 2022 it was announced that Chibana will join the coaching staff of the Israeli national women's judo team.

References

External links

 
 
 

Brazilian people of Japanese descent
Judoka at the 2015 Pan American Games
Living people
1989 births
Sportspeople from São Paulo
Place of birth missing (living people)
Brazilian male judoka
Pan American Games gold medalists for Brazil
Judoka at the 2016 Summer Olympics
Olympic judoka of Brazil
Pan American Games medalists in judo
Medalists at the 2015 Pan American Games